

Cabinet members

Cabinet as of 1 July 2011

References

Essid
Cabinets established in 2011
Cabinets disestablished in 2011
2011 in Tunisian politics
2011 establishments in Tunisia